Katherine T. Faber is an American materials scientist and engineer and is the Simon Ramo Professor of Materials Science at the California Institute of Technology (Caltech). Currently, Faber is the faculty representative for the Materials Science option at Caltech and is an adjunct Professor of Materials Science and Engineering at the McCormick School of Engineering and Applied Science at Northwestern University. She is co-founder and co-director of the Northwestern University/Art Institute of Chicago Center for Scientific Studies in the Arts (NU-ACCESS). 

Faber is a world expert in the study of mechanical behavior and material strengthening, and has been recognized for her work in the fracture mechanics of brittle materials and energy-related ceramics and composites. Her research encompasses a broad range of topics, from ceramics for thermal and environmental barrier coatings in power generation components to porous solids for filters and flow in medical applications. She oversees a number of collaborative endeavors, including projects with NASA's Jet Propulsion Laboratory, and polymer-related research with Professor Julia A. Kornfield.

Biography

Early life and education
Faber was the youngest daughter of an aspiring aeronautical engineer whose education was halted by the Great Depression. As the only one of her siblings who had an interest in the sciences, she was encouraged by her father to pursue an education in engineering. Faber eventually obtained her Bachelor of Science in Ceramic Engineering at the New York State College of Ceramics within Alfred University (1975). She completed her Master of Science in Ceramic Science at Penn State University (1978), after which she worked for a year as a development engineer for The Carborundum Company in Niagara Falls, New York, on the development of silicon carbide for high performance applications such as engines. Following her year in industry, Faber decided to pursue a Ph.D. in Materials Science at the University of California, Berkeley, which she completed in 1982.

Teaching, recognition
From 1982 to 1987, Faber served as Assistant and Associate Professor of Ceramic Engineering at the Ohio State University. She participated in the first class of the Defense Science Study Group, a program which introduces outstanding American science and engineering professors to the United States’ security challenges (1985–1988). From 1988 to 2014, she taught as Associate Professor, Professor, and Walter P. Murphy Professor of Materials Science and Engineering at the McCormick School of Engineering at Northwestern University, where she also served as the Chair of the University Materials Council (2001–2002). Additionally, from 2005 to 2007 she sat on the Scientific Advisory Committee of the Advanced Photon Source at Argonne National Lab. In 2014, she joined the teaching faculty at Caltech.

From 2006 to 2007, Faber served as the President of the American Ceramic Society, and in 2013 was named a Distinguished Life Member in recognition of her notable contributions to the ceramic and glass profession. In 2014, Faber was elected to the American Academy of Arts and Sciences class of fellows.

She has also been recognized with:
 IBM faculty development award (1984–1986)
 National Science Foundation (NSF) Presidential Young Investigator Award (1984–1989)
 Society of Women Engineers Distinguished Educator Award (1995)
 YWCA Achievement Award for Education (1997)
 NSF Creativity Extension Award (2001–2003)
 Fellowship in ASM International (2003)
 Pennsylvania State University College of Earth and Mineral Sciences Charles L. Hosler Alumni Scholar Medal (2004)
 American Ceramic Society John Jeppson Award (2015)

Work

Research
Faber's research is focused on fracture in brittle materials and mechanisms by which they can be strengthened and toughened. She and her PhD advisor, A.G. Evans, are credited with first developing a mechanics of materials model which predicts the fracture toughness increase due to crack deflection around second phase particles in a matrix. Her current work comprises research into characterizing the behavior of high-temperature ceramic coatings under cyclic thermal loading, which has applications in improving engine efficiency and wear; and the creation of high-temperature porous ceramics with increased strength and toughness, which have applications in filtration, energy storage, insulation, and medical devices. 

Faber heads many collaborative projects, including several with NASA's Jet Propulsion Laboratory (JPL). Her research with JPL encompasses composite systems of graphite and hexagonal boron nitride for Hall-effect thrusters in spacecrafts as well as the study of environmental degradation of composites in space. Her research interests also include silicon-based ceramics and ceramic matrix composites; polymer-derived multifunctional ceramics; graphite- and silicon carbide-based cellular ceramics synthesized from natural scaffolds, such as pyrolyzed wood; and cultural heritage science, with emphasis on porcelains and jades.

Initiatives
Faber is the co-founder and co-director of the Northwestern University–Art Institute of Chicago Center for Scientific Studies in the Arts (NU-ACCESS), a collaboration between Northwestern University and the Art Institute of Chicago in which advanced materials characterization and analytical techniques are used to further conservation science for historical artifacts.

Personal life 

Faber is married to condensed matter physicist, and current president of the California Institute of Technology, Thomas F. Rosenbaum. They began their careers at the California Institute of Technology in 2013 after Rosenbaum transitioned from his previous position as the John T. Wilson Distinguished Service Professor of Physics and university provost of The University of Chicago. Together, they have two sons, Daniel and Michael. Apart from her research, Faber is a patron of the arts and is especially drawn to theater and art museums. 

Faber and Rosenbaum have established several graduate fellowships and research funding opportunities for students. In 2014, she and Rosenbaum initiated a $100,000 graduate research fellowship at the University of Chicago’s Pritzker School of Molecular Engineering, which provides summer research support to students with the aim of increasing representation of women in STEM fields. Together, they created the Guy Rindone Graduate Research Fund (named after Faber's master’s thesis adviser) to help facilitate the choice of a research topic in the student's graduate education. In 2017, she and her husband became the first to contribute to the Gordon and Betty Moore Graduate Fellowship Match at Caltech, and later initiated the Rosenbaum-Faber Family Graduate Fellowship, which aims to provide graduate students with the freedom to pursue their studies and possibly change their research based on unexpected research results.

See Also 

 Ceramic Engineering
 Fracture
 Fracture toughness
 Toughening

Selected publications
Faber has authored over 150 papers, written three book chapters, and edited a book, Semiconductors and Semimetals: The Mechanical Properties of Semiconductors v. 37.  In 2003, She was recognized by the Institute for Scientific Information as a Highly Cited Author in Materials Science.

 Chari, C. S. and Faber, K. T. (2022) Oxidation resistance of AlN/BN via mullite-type Al₁₈B₄O₃₃. Journal of the European Ceramic Society, 42 (8). pp. 3437–3445. ISSN 0955-2219. doi:10.1016/j.jeurceramsoc.2022.02.037. https://resolver.caltech.edu/CaltechAUTHORS:20220222-706520000
 Chari, C.S., Taylor, Z.W., Bezur, A., Xie, S. and Faber, K.T., 2022. Nanoscale engineering of gold particles in 18th century Böttger lusters and glazes. Proceedings of the National Academy of Sciences, 119(18), p.e2120753119.
 Harder, Bryan J. and Good, Brian and Schmitt, Michael et al. (2022) Deposition of electrically conductive zirconium monoxide via plasma spray-physical vapor deposition. Journal of the American Ceramic Society, 105 (5). pp. 3568–3580. ISSN 0002-7820. doi:10.1111/jace.18309. https://resolver.caltech.edu/CaltechAUTHORS:20220121-733841000
 Arai, Noriaki and Faber, Katherine T. (2021) Freeze-cast honeycomb structures via gravity-enhanced convection. Journal of the American Ceramic Society, 104 (9). pp. 4309–4315. ISSN 0002-7820. doi:10.1111/jace.17871. https://resolver.caltech.edu/CaltechAUTHORS:20210504-120148263
 Kuo, Taijung and Rueschhoff, Lisa M. and Dickerson, Matthew B. et al. (2021) Hierarchical porous SiOC via freeze casting and self-assembly of block copolymers. Scripta Materialia, 191 . pp. 204–209. ISSN 1359-6462. doi:10.1016/j.scriptamat.2020.09.042. https://resolver.caltech.edu/CaltechAUTHORS:20201019-100031049
 Faber, K.T., Casadio, F., Masic, A., Robbiola, L. and Walton, M., 2021. Looking Back, Looking Forward: Materials Science in Art, Archaeology, and Art Conservation. Annual Review of Materials Research, 51, pp.435–460.
 Brodnik, N.R., Brach, S., Long, C.M., Ravichandran, G., Bourdin, B., Faber, K.T. and Bhattacharya, K., 2021. Fracture Diodes: Directional asymmetry of fracture toughness. Physical Review Letters, 126(2), p.025503.
 Zeng, Xiaomei and Martinolich, Andrew J. and See, Kimberly A. et al. (2020) Dense garnet-type electrolyte with coarse grains for improved air stability and ionic conductivity. Journal of Energy Storage, 27 . Art. No. 101128. ISSN 2352-152X. doi:10.1016/j.est.2019.101128. https://resolver.caltech.edu/CaltechAUTHORS:20191224-093208324
 Brodnik, N.R., Hsueh, C.J., Faber, K.T., Bourdin, B., Ravichandran, G. and Bhattacharya, K., 2020. Guiding and trapping cracks with compliant inclusions for enhancing toughness of brittle composite materials. Journal of Applied Mechanics, 87(3), p.031018.
 Sturdy, L.F., Wright, M.S., Yee, A., Casadio, F., Faber, K.T. and Shull, K.R., 2020. Effects of zinc oxide filler on the curing and mechanical response of alkyd coatings. Polymer, 191, p.122222.
 Brodnik, N. R. and Schmidt, J. and Colombo, P. et al. (2020) Analysis of Multi-scale Mechanical Properties of Ceramic Trusses Prepared from Preceramic Polymers. Additive Manufacturing, 31 . Art. No. 100957. ISSN 2214-8604. doi:10.1016/j.addma.2019.100957. https://resolver.caltech.edu/CaltechAUTHORS:20191120-091827034
 Buannic, L., Naviroj, M., Miller, S.M., Zagorski, J., Faber, K.T. and Llordés, A., 2019. Dense freeze‐cast Li7La3Zr2O12 solid electrolytes with oriented open porosity and contiguous ceramic scaffold. Journal of the American Ceramic Society, 102(3), pp.1021–1029.
 Tan, W.L., Faber, K.T. and Kochmann, D.M., 2019. In-situ observation of evolving microstructural damage and associated effective electro-mechanical properties of PZT during bipolar electrical fatigue. Acta Materialia, 164, pp.704–713.
 Stolzenburg, F., Kenesei, P., Almer, J., Lee, K.N., Johnson, M.T. and Faber, K.T., 2016. The influence of calcium–magnesium–aluminosilicate deposits on internal stresses in Yb2Si2O7 multilayer environmental barrier coatings. Acta Materialia, 105, pp.189–198.
 Naviroj, M., Miller, S.M., Colombo, P. and Faber, K.T., 2015. Directionally aligned macroporous SiOC via freeze casting of preceramic polymers. Journal of the European Ceramic Society, 35(8), pp.2225–2232.
 Stolzenburg, F., Johnson, M.T., Lee, K.N., Jacobson, N.S. and Faber, K.T., 2015. The interaction of calcium–magnesium–aluminosilicate with ytterbium silicate environmental barrier materials. Surface and Coatings Technology, 284, pp.44–50.
 Shanti, N.O., Chan, V.W., Stock, S.R., De Carlo, F., Thornton, K. and Faber, K.T., 2014. X-ray micro-computed tomography and tortuosity calculations of percolating pore networks. Acta Materialia, 71, pp.126–135.
 Chen-Wiegart, Y.C.K., Liu, Z., Faber, K.T., Barnett, S.A. and Wang, J., 2013. 3D analysis of a LiCoO2–Li (Ni1/3Mn1/3Co1/3) O2 Li-ion battery positive electrode using x-ray nano-tomography. Electrochemistry Communications, 28, pp.127–130.
 Liu, Z., Cronin, J.S., Yu-chen, K., Wilson, J.R., Yakal-Kremski, K.J., Wang, J., Faber, K.T. and Barnett, S.A., 2013. Three-dimensional morphological measurements of LiCoO2 and LiCoO2/Li (Ni1/3Mn1/3Co1/3) O2 lithium-ion battery cathodes. Journal of Power Sources, 227, pp.267–274.
 Harder, B.J., Ramìrez‐Rico, J., Almer, J.D., Lee, K.N. and Faber, K.T., 2011. Chemical and mechanical consequences of environmental barrier coating exposure to calcium–magnesium–aluminosilicate. Journal of the American Ceramic Society, 94, pp.s178-s185.
 Johnson, M.T. and Faber, K.T., 2011. Catalytic graphitization of three-dimensional wood-derived porous scaffolds. Journal of Materials Research, 26(1), pp.18–25.
 Kaul, V.S., Faber, K.T., Sepulveda, R., de Arellano López, A.R. and Martinez-Fernandez, J., 2006. Precursor selection and its role in the mechanical properties of porous SiC derived from wood. Materials Science and Engineering: A, 428(1–2), pp.225–232.
 Seitz, M.E., Burghardt, W.R., Faber, K.T. and Shull, K.R., 2007. Self-assembly and stress relaxation in acrylic triblock copolymer gels. Macromolecules, 40(4), pp.1218–1226.
 Pappacena, K.E., Faber, K.T., Wang, H. and Porter, W.D., 2007. Thermal conductivity of porous silicon carbide derived from wood precursors. Journal of the American Ceramic Society, 90(9), pp.2855–2862.
 Su, Y.J., Trice, R.W., Faber, K.T., Wang, H. and Porter, W.D., 2004. Thermal conductivity, phase stability, and oxidation resistance of Y3Al5O12 (YAG)/Y2O3–ZrO2 (YSZ) thermal-barrier coatings. Oxidation of metals, 61(3), pp.253–271.
 Trice, R.W., Su, Y.J., Mawdsley, J.R., Faber, K.T., Arellano-López, D., Wang, H. and Porter, W.D., 2002. Effect of heat treatment on phase stability, microstructure, and thermal conductivity of plasma-sprayed YSZ. Journal of materials science, 37(11), pp.2359–2365.

References 

Living people
Year of birth missing (living people)
Place of birth missing (living people)
Women materials scientists and engineers
American materials scientists
California Institute of Technology faculty
Alfred State College alumni
Penn State College of Earth and Mineral Sciences alumni
University of California, Berkeley alumni
Northwestern University faculty
21st-century American scientists
21st-century American women scientists
20th-century American scientists
20th-century American women scientists
American women academics